Slaviša Čula (Serbian Cyrillic: Cлaвишa Чулa; born 28 November 1968 in Kostolac) is a Serbian former football player.

He won Yugoslav First League in 1991.

During his career he had played for FK Napredak Kruševac, FK Sutjeska Nikšić, Red Star Belgrade, FK Proleter Zrenjanin, FK Borac Banja Luka, Örgryte IS, FC Dinamo București, Hapoel Be'er Sheva, Enosis Neon Paralimni FC, Olympiakos Nicosia and FK Rudar Kostolac

References

External links
 Stats from the Yugoslav League at Zerodic.
 Israel 1997/98 at RSSSF.

1968 births
Living people
Yugoslav footballers
Serbian footballers
Serbian expatriate footballers
Yugoslav First League players
Allsvenskan players
Liga I players
Cypriot First Division players
FK Napredak Kruševac players
FK Sutjeska Nikšić players
Red Star Belgrade footballers
FK Proleter Zrenjanin players
FK Borac Banja Luka players
Örgryte IS players
FC Dinamo București players
Hapoel Be'er Sheva F.C. players
Enosis Neon Paralimni FC players
Olympiakos Nicosia players
Expatriate footballers in Romania
Expatriate footballers in Cyprus
Expatriate footballers in Sweden
Expatriate footballers in Israel
Association football forwards
Serbian expatriate sportspeople in Romania
Serbian expatriate sportspeople in Israel
Serbian expatriate sportspeople in Sweden
Serbian expatriate sportspeople in Cyprus